Earl Dewitt Hutto (May 12, 1926 – December 14, 2020) was an American politician who served as U.S. Representative from Florida's 1st congressional district.

Early life
Born in Midland City, Alabama, Hutto attended Dale County public schools and received a Bachelor of Science from Troy State University in 1949. He served in the United States Navy from 1944 to 1946. Afterward he returned to graduate school, studying broadcasting at Northwestern University in 1951. He worked as sports director at WEAR-TV in Pensacola, Florida from 1954 to 1961, WSFA-TV in Montgomery, Alabama from 1961 to 1963, and WJHG-TV in Panama City, Florida, from 1961 to 1973.  He operated an advertising agency from 1973 to 1979.

Political career
Hutto was elected as a Democrat to the Florida House of Representatives in 1972 and was reelected in 1974 and 1976. He was elected in 1978 to the 96th and to the seven succeeding Congresses, serving from January 3, 1979, to January 3, 1995. He decided not to run as a candidate in 1994 for reelection to the 104th Congress.

Hutto was one of the most conservative Democrats in Congress. This was not surprising given the nature of his district. It moved away from its "Solid South" roots somewhat sooner than the rest of Florida; its white voters had begun splitting their tickets as early as the 1950s. However, Hutto usually skated to reelection for most of his tenure, with Republicans usually fielding nominal challengers the few times they fielded candidates at all.

From 1978 to 1988, Hutto never dropped below 61 percent of the vote, easily winning reelection even in years when Republican presidential candidates carried the 1st in landslides. In 1984, for instance, he was completely unopposed for reelection even as Ronald Reagan carried the district with over 70 percent of the vote. In 1988, as George H. W. Bush carried the 1st by a similar margin to the one Reagan scored four years earlier, Hutto was reelected with 66 percent of the vote. Despite his popularity in the district, it was widely believed that he would be succeeded by a Republican once he retired, given its growing Republican trend at the national level.

He voted against the Comprehensive Anti-Apartheid Act in 1986.

In 1990, Republican challenger Terry Ketchel held Hutto to 52 percent of the vote in the district's first competitive contest in recent memory. Hutto defeated Ketchel in a rematch in 1992, but was once again held to only 52 percent of the vote. He opted not to run for reelection in 1994, and was succeeded by Republican Joe Scarborough. Proving just how Republican this district was, no Democrat has garnered more than 40% of the vote since Hutto left office.

Death
Hutto died in December 2020 at the age of 94.

References

External links

1926 births
2020 deaths
People from Dale County, Alabama
Military personnel from Alabama
Troy University alumni
Northwestern University School of Communication alumni
American advertising executives
American radio executives
Democratic Party members of the United States House of Representatives from Florida
American sports journalists
American television journalists
United States Navy sailors
Democratic Party members of the Florida House of Representatives
United States Navy personnel of World War II